İlayda Güner (born 5 November 1999) is a Turkish basketball player for Beşiktaş and the Turkish national team.

She participated at the 2018 FIBA Women's Basketball World Cup.

References

External links

1999 births
Living people
Centers (basketball)
People from Güngören
Footballers from Istanbul
Turkish women's basketball players
21st-century Turkish women